Hungry Ghost is the third studio album by Australian alternative rock band Violent Soho. It was released on I Oh You Records in September 2013.

Title 
According to the band's frontman Luke Beardham, the title of the album and the song of the same name, originally referring to Chinese Buddhism, was taken from the book Culture Jam by Canadian civil activist Kalle Lasna and allegorically implies a person who, in an effort to fulfill his desire loses himself. Boredam has also said Hungry Ghost "dealt with the spiritual skeleton we’ve become from this spoon-fed reality."

Track listing

Personnel

Violent Soho
 Luke Boerdam – lead vocals, rhythm guitars
 James Tidswell – lead guitars
 Luke Henery – bass guitars, backing vocals
 Michael Richards – drums, percussion

Charts and certifications

Weekly Charts

Certifications

ARIA Awards

|-
|rowspan="4"| 2014 ||rowspan="2"| "Saramona Said" || ARIA Award for Best Group|| 
|-
| Best Independent Release || 
|-
| "Covered in Chrome" || Best Video || 
|-

References

External links
 https://itunes.apple.com/au/album/hungry-ghost/id665829307?app=itunes&ign-mpt=uo%3D4

2013 albums
Violent Soho albums
SideOneDummy Records albums